CMM may refer to:

Science and technology
 Capability Maturity Model, a tool for assessing processes in organizations during software development
 Clavibacter michiganensis subsp. michiganensis, plant pathogen subspecies
 Cluster management module, part of a Motorola Canopy system
 Color management module, a term in color management
 Conditional Markov model or maximum-entropy Markov model
 Coordinate-measuring machine, a device for dimensional measuring
 Coordinated management of meaning, a communications theory
 Cybersecurity maturity model, a type of maturity model
 C--, also pronounced Cmm, a programming language

Mathematics
 The wallpaper group cmm (2*22)

Organisations
 Canadian Methodist Mission
 Center for Mathematical Modeling, a research institute in Chile
 Centre de Morphologie Mathématique (Center of Mathematical Morphology), a research center of the École des Mines de Paris in France
 Chhattisgarh Mukti Morcha, a political party in India
 Congregation of the Missionaries of Mariannhill

Other uses
 Commander of the Order of Military Merit, a Canadian decoration
 Communauté métropolitaine de Montréal (CMM), French name of the Montreal Metropolitan Community (MMC), part of Greater Montreal
 Corpus mensurabilis musicae, a collection of polyphonic vocal music of the Renaissance